Stars-AO  also known as Aoi is an experimental cubesat with a small camera packaged. It uses amateur radio frequencies to communicate with the ground.

Overview

References

External links 

Space telescopes